Strabala rufa is a species of flea beetle in the family Chrysomelidae. It is found in North America.

Subspecies
These two subspecies belong to the species Strabala rufa:
 Strabala rufa floridana Blake, 1953
 Strabala rufa rufa (Illiger, 1807)

References

Further reading

 
 

Alticini
Articles created by Qbugbot
Beetles described in 1807